Mtsangamboua is a village in the commune of Bandraboua on Mayotte.

Populated places in Mayotte